Association Sportive Dragon is a football club based in Papeete, Tahiti. They play in the Tahiti First Division, who play their home games at Stade Pater, in Pirae.

The club was founded in 1968 by Arthur Chung to represent French Polynesia's Chinese community. Over time the team has evolved to include a diverse mix of cultures, and mostly consists of semi-professional players with day jobs. In the 2011–12 season they won the championship for the first time and qualified for the 2012–13 OFC Champions League.

Continental record

Current squad
Squad for the 2019-20 Tahiti Ligue 1

Staff

Achievements
Tahiti First Division: 3
2011–12, 2012–13, 2016–17.

Tahiti Cup: 6
 1997, 2001, 2004, 2013, 2016, 2018.

Tahiti Coupe des Champions: 2
 1997, 2016.

Last seasons

References

Football clubs in Tahiti
Football clubs in French Polynesia
Papeete
1968 establishments in French Polynesia
Association football clubs established in 1968